M'Clintock House, also known as the Baptist Parsonage, is a historic home located at Waterloo in Seneca County, New York.  It is a two-story, Federal style brick dwelling built in 1833–1836.  The home is notable as the residence of Quaker pharmacist Thomas M'Clintock and his wife Mary Ann from 1836 to 1856. On July 16, 1848, the home was the location where the Declaration of Sentiments, resolutions, and speeches were drawn up for the subsequent First Women's Rights Convention.

It was listed on the National Register of Historic Places in 1980.

The house is one of the sites of the Women's Rights National Historical Park.  The restored mid-19th century home is open for tours in the summer.

See also
List of monuments and memorials to women's suffrage
Votes For Women History Trail
Timeline of women's suffrage
Women's suffrage in the United States

References

External links

M'Clintock House - Women's Rights National Historic Park

Museums in Seneca County, New York
Houses on the National Register of Historic Places in New York (state)
Historic American Buildings Survey in New York (state)
History of women's rights in the United States
Historic house museums in New York (state)
History museums in New York (state)
Women's museums in the United States
Women's Rights National Historical Park
Clergy houses in the United States
Houses in Seneca County, New York
National Register of Historic Places in Seneca County, New York
Waterloo, New York
History of women in New York (state)